Dichomeris levigata is a moth in the family Gelechiidae. It was described by Edward Meyrick in 1913. It is found in Sri Lanka.

The forewings are pale yellow ochreous with a very small dark fuscous spot on the base of the costa, and an elongate dark fuscous mark at two-thirds, the costa between these is obscurely dotted with dark fuscous. The stigmata are dark fuscous, the plical rather large, slightly before the first discal. There is also a narrow rather dark purplish-fuscous terminal fascia which is widest at the apex and narrowed to the tornus. The hindwings are grey.

References

Moths described in 1913
inserrata